Schweizerische Zeitschrift für Forstwesen (the Swiss Forestry Journal) is one of the oldest forestry journals still in print in the world. It was established in 1850.

See also 
 List of forestry journals

References

Publications established in 1850
Forestry journals
Multilingual journals
Monthly journals
Forestry in Europe
Forestry in Switzerland
Academic journals published by learned and professional societies